Terminal complement pathway deficiency is a genetic condition affecting the complement membrane attack complex (MAC).

It involves deficiencies of C5, C6, C7, and C8.  (While C9 is part of the MAC, and deficiencies have been identified, it is not required for cell lysis.)

People with this condition are prone to meningococcal infection. Vaccination may be recommended.

Cause

Diagnosis
Suspect terminal complement pathway deficiency with patients who have more than one episode of Neisseria infection. 

Initial complement tests often include C3 and C4, but not C5 through C9. Instead, the CH50 result may play a role in diagnosis: if the CH50 level is low but C3 and C4 are normal, then analysis of the individual terminal components may be warranted.

Treatment
Patients with terminal complement pathway deficiency should receive meningococcal and pneumococcal vaccinations. They can receive live vaccines.

References

External links 

Complement deficiency